Lizinska de Mirbel (26 July 1796 – 29 August 1849) was a French painter of miniature portraits. She was very fashionable among the aristocracy of Paris during the Bourbon Restoration and the July Monarchy.

Early years

Lizinca-Aimée-Zoé Rue was born in Cherbourg on 8 Thermidor year IV (26 July 1796).
Her father was Gilles-Marie-Georges Rue, controller of the navy.
Her mother was Eulalie-Zoé Bailly de Monthion, sister of General François Gédéon Bailly de Monthion (1776–1850).
Her relatives were all wealthy, apart from her father.
She spent her early childhood in Cherbourg, then moved to Sas van Gent during the Consulate when her father was reduced in rank to deputy commissioner of registration there.
Around 1806, after her father had been dismissed from the navy, Lizinca moved to Paris to stay with her uncle, General de Monthion.
Her father suffered from a disease of the brain, and ended his life in a hospital.
General de Monthion tried to give Lizinca an excellent education.

Studies

Lizinca knew she must find a way to earn a living, and thought that painting would be suitable.
She decided to specialise in miniatures, which were less messy than larger oil paintings.
At the age of 18 she enrolled as a pupil of Jean-Baptiste Jacques Augustin.
Augustin taught her the technical skills of miniature painting, and she then followed the advice of a family friend, M. Belloc, and left the studio to devote herself to learning to draw by copying the masters.
Her first commercial effort was a miniature of a niece of M. Rousseau, then one of the mayors of Paris and later a Peer of France.
She made a number of other practice miniatures before making her first portraits.
These included President Amy, King Louis XVIII of France, the Duke of Fitz-James and Perronet, the king's valet.
The portraits of President Amy and Perronet are among her masterpieces.

Success

Lizinca made her studies of the king during several breakfasts, where she had to stand at all times, close enough to study the face but not so close as to disturb him. 
The painting was a success, and the king took an interest in her as a sensible and witty but modest woman.
Lizinca became one of the nominal mistresses of Louis XVIII, who had been widowed since 1810 and followed convention by always having an official mistress.
As with the other women, the relationship was limited to jokes and cuddles and gay remarks.
The king's true interest was in a few men whose fortunes he had made.

The king helped to find a husband for Lizinca, and she accepted his choice.
She married Charles François Brisseau de Mirbel on 18 May 1824.
He was born on 27 March 1776, was 48 years old when they married and had been a widower for 13 years.
He was a member of the Académie des Sciences and a knight of the Legion of Honour.
He was a professor of botany at the Jardin des plantes.
The government gave the Mirbels a small apartment on the third floor of a house near the Carrousel.
James Fenimore Cooper visited her there in 1827 after climbing up a narrow, steep and winding set of stairs.
He observed that "M. de [Mirbel] is a man of talents and great respectability, and his wife is exceedingly clever, but they are not rich. He is a professor, and she is an artist."
He wrote,

From this time Lizinca de Mirbel became much in demand by the Paris élite due to the king's favour.
She was house painter to Louis XVIII and his successor Charles X.
She won a second class medal at the 1822 Exposition.
She was awarded the first class gold medal at the Paris Salon of 1827 for her miniatures and watercolors.
Her work won awards in all the subsequent exhibitions apart from those of 1836, 1838 and 1843.
She competed at the 1849 exhibition, where she won a second class medal.
Some of portraits exhibited at different shows included King Charles X, the Duke of Fitz-James (1827), Élie, duc Decazes, the Princess of Chalais, Count Demidoff (1834) Louis-Philippe, Queen of the Belgians, Duke of Orleans, Count of Paris, Fanny Elssler (1839), General Gourgaud (1841), François Guizot (1844), Duchess of Treviso (1845), Marshal de Reggio (1847) and Émile de Girardin (1848).

Lizinca de Mirbel  was particularly known for her portraits of elderly men and women.
Pierre Paul Emmanuel de Pommayrac was one of her pupils.
She died of cholera on 30 August 1849 during an epidemic.

Notes

Sources

1796 births
1849 deaths
French women painters
Portrait miniaturists
Deaths from cholera